West Pearl Tower is a  tower built of reinforced concrete located in Chengdu, Sichuan Province, China. West Pearl Tower started construction in 1992 but construction was halted later in the year due to budgeting problems. Construction restarted in 1998 and was completed in 2004.  It was mainly built to help TV networks across Chengdu but since then it has expanded to include a revolving restaurant with a 360 degree view of the city, and a recreational and commercial mall for Chengdu.

References

External links

 
 

Towers completed in 2004
Buildings and structures in Chengdu
Observation towers in China
Towers with revolving restaurants
Tourist attractions in Chengdu
2004 establishments in China